Neomeoneurites is a genus of  flies (Diptera). There are 2 described species.

Species
M. chilensis Hennig, 1972
N. dissitus Wheeler, 1994

References

Carnidae
Carnoidea genera
Taxa named by Willi Hennig